Illinois Route 48 (IL 48) is an  north–south state highway with its southern terminus at Interstate 55 (I-55) and IL 127 in Raymond and its northern terminus at IL 54 east of Clinton.

Route description 

IL 48 travels southwest to northeast from I-55 to IL 54 east of Clinton. It is an undivided surface street for its entire length. It also serves the cities of Raymond, Taylorville, and Decatur.

IL 48 and IL 127 travel east starting at an interchange with I-55. In Raymond, IL 127 turns south, while IL 48 travels northeast. IL 48 serves Harvel, Morrisonville, Palmer, and Clarksdale. IL 48 then bypasses Hewittsville and downtown Taylorville and intersects with IL 29. Continuing toward Decatur, IL 48 serves Willeys, Stonington, Blue Mound, and Boody. The route has an interchange with US 51 before entering through the city limit of Decatur.

Near downtown Decatur, IL 48 intersects with IL 105 before crossing over the Sangamon River. At the Millikin University, IL 48 indirectly meets US 36. IL 48 then turns east along IL 121. IL 48 turns northeast at a continuous-flow intersection. From there until Cisco, IL 48 parallels I-72. Between two interchanges with I-72 at Decatur and Cisco, the route serves Oreana and Argenta. After Cisco, the route curves north for the remainder of the route, serving Weldon and IL 10. IL 48 eventually ends at IL 54 in Fullerton.

History 
SBI Route 48 traveled from Onarga to Raymond via the current IL 48 and IL 54. The route appeared in 1929 with the construction of a diagonal roadway. Construction of a new road concluded by 1935. The portion from Fullerton to Onarga became part of an extension of US 54 in 1942. In 1972, IL 54 was assigned from Springfield to Onarga after US 54 was reverted to its pre-1942 terminus at US 36 (now IL 107) west of Pittsfield.

Major intersections

See also 

 List of state routes in Illinois

References

External links

048
U.S. Route 54
Transportation in Montgomery County, Illinois
Transportation in Christian County, Illinois
Transportation in Macon County, Illinois
Transportation in DeWitt County, Illinois
Transportation in Piatt County, Illinois